Lusitano Ginásio Clube, MHC, also commonly known as Lusitano de Évora (abbrev. Lusit. Évora), is a Portuguese sports club based in Évora competing in the Campeonato de Portugal, the fourth-tier league in the Portuguese football system. Founded 11 November 1911 by a group of high school and commercial school youngsters in the house of professor Dâmaso Simões at Rua das Fontes, No. 3 in Évora as Lusitano Académico, it subsequently became Lusitano Futebol and finally Lusitano Ginásio Clube in 1925. The club's home ground is the Campo Estrela in Évora, purchased in 1931.

Lusitano entered the 1952–53 Primeira Divisão, finishing up 7th in their first season ever. The club competed for 14 consecutive seasons in the Primeira Divisão, its major period of success in the 1950s and 1960s, earning an honorable 5th place in 1956/57, and reaching the semi-finals of the Taça de Portugal twice. After relegation in 1966 the club went through a period of decline, never regaining access to the Portuguese top flight ever again and even descending to regional championships. The club is still today in the top teams with the most presences in the Portuguese League and the 14th with more consecutive presences.

History
The name "Lusitano" is derived from Lusitania, the Roman name for the Roman province corresponding to the current territory of Portugal south of the Douro river plus the modern-day Spanish region of Extremadura, and it is a generally accepted synonym of Portuguese. The Lusitanians (Lusitanos in Portuguese language) was the people of Lusitania.

Motto
The club's motto is Fazer Forte Fraca Gente (Portuguese for Making the Weak Stronger).

Foundation
The club was founded 11 November 1911 (11-11-1911 in a sport played with 11 players). In addition, its first headquarters was in Travessa da Bola No. 11, in Évora.

Anthem 
The club's anthem was composed by poet Celestino David in 1926

Camaradas da luta e do sonho

Companheiros no mesmo ideal

Entoemos um canto risonho

Que levante, a cantar, Portugal

Exaltemos a força que dá

A alegria, a saúde, o valor...

Pois com eles um dia virá

Outra vida, outro sol, outro amor

Sem intuitos de guerras e lida

Em batalhas que o ódio revela

Recordemos as forças e a vida

Num anseio de vidas mais belas

First victories
In 1917/18 Lusitano won its first Evora FA championship. It would win many district championships afterwards (1921/22, 1922/23, 1926/27, 1927/28, 1928/29. 1930/31, 1932/33, 1933/34, 1934/35, 1939/40, 1940/41).

The year 1925 proved decisive for the future of the club. At the initiative of historical leaders such as José Benchimol, Napoleão Palma, Alberto da Conceição and António Prazeres, the club was restructured, the facilities were reorganized and its action extended to other modalities, with emphasis on gymnastics that would reach great projection. Lusitano started investing on a concept of full personal development, involving the man and the athlete, a design that would be the hallmark of all those who have passed through their teams over the years.

Between 1929/30 and 1933/34 the Eborians competed in the Campeonato de Portugal, without recording significant results. The club obtained its best classification in 1930/31, reaching the quarter-finals lost to Salgueiros.

In 1931 the mythical Campo Estrela was purchased. On 6 November 1932, Lusitano beat Benfica 4–1 in Evora in a friendly match. Between 1934/35 and 1937/38 the club was one of the forerunners of the League Championship of the Second Division. In the 1938/39 season the Portuguese Championship was renamed Taça de Portugal (TP) and the 2nd Division championship was created.

The golden age
In 1951/52 Lusitano became National Champion of the Segunda Divisão, after winning the final pole of the competition with Vitória de Setúbal, Torreense and U. de Coimbra. It was a sublime moment in the history of the club.
The last game, refereed by A. Calheiros, took place in Campo Estrela on 6 January 1952 and ended with a 0–0 draw between Eborians and Sadinos. Lusitano lined-up with the following roster: Dinis Vital; Eduardo and Soeiro; Madeira, Valle and Paulo; Pepe, Di Paola, Teixeira da Silva, Duarte and Domingo.
The entrance of the club in the greater division of Portuguese football was commemorated all around the city. The famous Praça do Geraldo received countless expressions of joy.
Évora entered the map of Portuguese football. The winning coach, was former Lazio and Banfield player Anselmo Pisa.
On 28 September 1952 Dinis Vital, Soeiro, Paixão, Madeira, Valle, Paulo, Flora, Di Paola, Patalino, Batalha and Duarte debuted in the competition. In the 1952/53 season Lusitano achieved a record that was only beaten the by Famalicão in the 2019/2020 season, i.e., never a newly promoted team was leading the table by the 5th matchday.
Also in 1952 the Players Statute was approved. The document contained the rights and duties of the players, defined the prizes policy and praised correctness, loyalty and fair play.
Also in the Taça de Portugal the club surprised, by eliminating Sporting in the quarter-finals.
A 3–3 draw in 1953/54, in Évora, against Sporting and the victory against Porto by 2-0 encouraged leaders and supporters.
In the 1954/55 season, already under the command of Cândido Tavares, the club finished 10th place in the Primeira Divisão, having beaten Sporting 2–1. Also FC Porto with Barrigana, Hernâni and Pedroto would crash in Campo Estrela 2–1. "Porto scored first yesterday in Évora - but did not escape defeat ..." - titled A Bola. In the Taça de Portugal, wins 2–1 against V. de Guimarães and 2–0 against FC Porto.
In 1955/56, Lusitano finished 8th. Under the guidance of Severiano Correia, the base team included Dinis Vital, Polido, Paixão, José da Costa, Falé, Vicente, Batalha, Vieira, Patalino, Caraça and José Pedro. Special highlight for the 1–1 draw against Sporting in Évora, in a game that inaugurated the new pitch of Campo Estrela. In the Estádio da Luz a 1–1 draw against Benfica.

In the 1956/57 season, led by Otto Bumbel, the club achieved its best performance in the biggest event of Portuguese football, reaching an exceptional 5th place.
Won 13 out of 26 matches and recorded impressive results during the competition: wins in Evora by 3–2 against Porto (Flora hat-trick) and 2–1 against Sporting, as well as 1-1 draws in Estádio José Alvalade and 2 -2 at the Estádio da Luz.
In the 1957/58 season, already under the guidance of Lorenzo Ausina, Lusitano obtained a resounding victory against Benfica by 4–0, in the 8th matchday, at Campo Estrela.
In 1958/59, high note for the draws 0-0 and 3–3 at Campo Estrela, against Benfica and Sporting, respectively and return to the Cup semi-finals (eliminated by FC Porto).
Otto Bumbel returned to the club in 61/62, but the league streak confirmed the downward trend (12th place with 20 pts). Highlight, in any case, for another victory against Sporting, in the knockout round of the Cup (4-1).
Already under the command of Josef Fabian, in 1962/63 Lusitano obtained an honorable 7th place with 23 points. In terms of Taça de Portugal the club obtained its biggest victory so far in official games, beating Portalegrense, in the first round, in Evora, 10–0.

Finally, the 1965/66 season would be a sad memory for the club and to all its fans. Lusitano said goodbye to the 1st Division, accompanied by Barreirense, finishing 13th, with only 14 pts, losing 16 of the 26 games played.

They had 14 consecutive seasons in which Évora was at the center of the great decisions of national football, mobilizing crowds whenever the big teams, would come to play at the Museum City. The roads were embellished and all paths converged towards the Campo Estrela. The pilgrimage was indescribable.

It was in this golden period for Portuguese football that Sporting won the 1963–64 Cup Winners Cup, that Benfica reached its apogee in Europe with the double victory in the European Champion Clubs' Cup (1960/61 and 1961/62) and that the national team reached its best classification ever in a FIFA World Cup (3rd place in 1966 World Cup).

The 70s in the Second Division
Lusitano spent the rest of the 1960s in the Segunda Divisão until relegation to the third tier by the end of the 1969/70 season. A period of several promotions and relegations between the third and second division followed without really contending access back to the top tier.

In this period Lusitano were vice-champions of the Third Division in the 1972/73 season, losing the final to Lourosa (0-1).

Almost back in the 80s
In the 1979/80 season Lusitano had a great season in the Segunda Divisão fighting shoulder to shoulder with Amora FC coached by José Mourinho`s father Mourinho Félix and overcoming clubs such as Farense, Estrela da Amadora, Nacional, Barreirense and rivals Juventude. Lusitano started the season with a loss and two draws (including a 0–0 draw against eventual winners Amora FC). However wins against Sacavenense, Nacional and Estrela da Amadora as well as away draws against Farense and Fabril boosted the team a great second round of the season. Amora FC eventually gained direct promotion by finishing 1st and actually became Segunda Divisão champions, while Lusitano had to enter the promotion play-offs against Central and North zones runners-up Académico de Viseu and Fafe. Lusitano lost both matches against Académico de Viseu and the match in Fafe, thereby failing promotion back to the Primeira Divisão.

After a 9th place the following season (in which rivals Juventude nearly got promotion to the Primeira Divisão) and a 3rd place in 1981/82 (only behind Marítimo and Farense) Lusitano announced that Dinis Vital, former captain and the club's main symbol would be appointed as manager for the 1982/83 season. Vital had nearly taken rivals Juventude to the Primeira Divisão in 1981 and took Ginásio de Alcobaça to their only top tier presence in 1982. Vital left Ginásio de Alcobaça in the first division and returned to the club.

The season did not seem easy with former Portuguese champions Belenenses (playing in the second division for the first time in history) Farense, Olhanense, Nacional, União da Madeira, Barreirense, Atlético and Juventude. However Lusitano had an amazing season, actually beating Belenenses (1-0) in the Campo Estrela and losing only twice in Évora against Farense and Nacional. However, Lusitano struggled with difficulties in away matches, winning only twice. Farense, coached by Hristo Mladenov won the series and gained direct promotion to the top tier, in addition to becoming Segunda Divisão champions, while Lusitano had to face the play-offs once again. This time the opponents were Sporting de Espinho, Vizela and another historic club Académica de Coimbra. Notwithstanding a Lusitano victory in Coimbra (1-2), Sporting de Espinho with former Benfica striker Moínhos was too strong winning both matches against the Eborians and gaining access to Primeira Divisao via play-off.

Dinis Vital left the club in the end of the season. He would still gain Farense's promotion in 1986, the year Lusitano was relegated to the third division. The club never again had real a fighting chance to return to the top flight.

Wandering in the lower leagues
By 1990 Lusitano was playing the Segunda Divisão once again, when the FPF announced its intention to extinguish this competition and replace it with two new ones. The Segunda Liga (Divisão de Honra) with no regional separation (second tier) and a II Division B (third tier) with a North, Central and South zones. Teams finishing in the top 7 in three zones of the Segunda Divisão in 1990 would either obtain: (a) direct promotion to top tier (1st place), (b) access to the promotion playoffs (2nd place) or (c) access to the new Divisão de Honra. Lusitano finished 12th and therefore was allocated to the also newly created II Division B (third tier), were it remained until 1995 (with a brief participation in the Third Division). However, the Third Division would be the club's destiny for the second half of the nineties.

The club won the III Division, Series F in the 1993/94 season, as well as the Second Stage, losing the national finals to Liminanos ans thus becoming III Division Vice-Champions.

The 2000/2001 Promotion to the II Division B put the club in severe economic difficulties. Also due to a disastrous political option by the FPF. According to the regulations all the teams from Madeira and Azores were automatically allocated to the Southern series of the II B and Third Division. This would mean that rich clubs in the North and Centre of Portugal would only need to travel a few kilometers to play, poor teams from the South were forced to exhausting and expensive flights to the islands constantly throughout the mid-1990s and 2000s.

Regional league, decline and insolvency

Lusitano spent its 100th birthday with no professional football team registered.

The club was suspended in the 2011–12 season from entering any tier in the Portuguese football pyramid. In 2013–14 they were allowed to start over in the Évora District League Divisão de Honra Série A (regional second division, fifth division overall).

The failed SAD project and division of the club

On 14 July 2016, the Lusitano Ginásio Clube, Futebol SAD (Sports Company) was created and the Portuguese entrepreneur Nuno Madeira Rodrigues took on the role of president of the board of directors of the newly incorporated SAD. The club transferred the management of professional senior football rights to this newly created entity. The main goal was to bring Lusitano back to the big stage once again.

After rebirth the club has mostly competed in the regional leagues until promotion to the Campeonato de Portugal by the end of the 2018/19 season. After the return of professional football in 2013, and especially since the incorporation of the SAD, Lusitano were Évora FA Champions in 2018/19, won the Évora FA Cup three times in a row 2016, 2017 and 2018, as well as the Évora FA Super Cup 2017 and 2019.

However, after promotion to the third tier at the end of the 2018/2019 season, the club accused the SAD of abandoning the team throughout the season and thus the merit belonged to the club staff. This led to a separation. Lusitano SAD would keep the professional team, most of the sponsors, the access to the Silveirinha Sports Complex and would participate in the Campeonato de Portugal and, on the other hand, a newly created Associação Lusitano de Évora 1911 would keep the Campo Estrela, the youth teams, the amateur sports and would compete in the EVORA FA second-tier league.

On 8 April 2019 due to the COVID-19 pandemic situation, the Portuguese FA cancelled the 2019/20 season of the Campeonato de Portugal. Therefore, there were nor promotions or relegations. Lusitano thus earned the right to remain in this league. The FA also announced the creation of a new third tier in 2021/2022 below the professional 1st and 2nd tier called III Liga. The Campeonato de Portugal will thus become the fourth tier above regional leagues.

In June 2020, Lusitano Ginásio Clube, Futebol, SAD announced that it had reached an agreement with Nigerian entrepreneur Dorothy Nneka Ede, such agreement focusing on a new investment into the club targeting a promotion to higher tiers of Portuguese championships, combined with a total revamp of the Silveirinha infrastructures and the creation of a U-23 team which will serve as nursery for young national and international talents. However, after disagreemens with the owners of the SAD, the board of directors and Nuno Madeira Rodrigues have resigned. Following the resignation of the Board, Lusitano SAD was not able to secure permanence in the Campeonato de Portugal and was relegated to the regional league, were they were set to compete against the Associação Lusitano de Évora 1911. Notwithstanding, the new owners were also unable to register playeres with the Evora FA for the 2021/2022 season, and also claimed to no longer have access to the Silveirinha Sports Complex. The project of the SAD was dead, five years after its inception.

After two years were there were two Lusitano teams, the club now competes in the Évora FA first tier in the 2021/2022 season.

The team recently conquered the Évora FA Cup in the 2020/2021 season, beating União Montemor in the final, played in Arraiolos.

Stadiums

Campo Estrela

The Campo Estrela was inaugurated June 15, 1914. It is the fourth oldest football pitch in the country still existing, only surpassed by the Bessa (1911) and the Campo da Constituição (1912) both in Oporto and by the Tapadinha in Lisbon, opened in the same year of 1914.

The stadium is a landmark of Évora and contrarily to popular belief not only associated with Lusitano. The genesis of its construction is umbilically linked to the outbreak of sport in the city and was the first permanent site dedicated to the practice of athletic sports, as it was called. The construction initiative came from the Ateneu Sport Eborense, founded 15 June 1913 by a group of athletes who had left Sport Vitória Académico and who leased the site for fifteen years to install a football and athletics facility (to a lesser extent shooting and equestrianism). Over the years football clearly surpassed all other sports. In 1922 the Ateneu folded and its president, Emídio Crujeira de Carvalho, handed over all its assets and sports equipment to Lusitano, thereby terminating the lease. In 1926 the site was leased by another club, the Ginásio Club Eborense and suffered some abandonment. This club also folded 2 years latter and Lusitano started leasing the Campo Estrela for its participation in the Campeonato de Portugal.

In 1931, former president and lawyer Mário Ribeiro de Lemos planned an operation for the purchase of the Campo Estrela for 30,000 PTE. The money came directly from the pocket of Mário Ribeiro de Lemos and as soon as the public deed was executed on 3 February 1931, recovery, enlargement and improvement works started immediately over four years. In 1935 it was completely unrecognizable. The pitch was excellent and two locker rooms had been built, with 4 showers each, and a third on for the referees to be isolated from the players. A national innovation. There was a storage room to store various materials. Six rows of wooden benches with a capacity of more than 300 people in a length of more than 60 meters, which were completed by structures for the opening of 18 cabins. It was by far the best field in the Alentejo and one of the best in Portugal.

Campo Estrela also knew its golden period during the 14 years in which Lusitano remained in the I Division (1952-1966). At the end of 1953 the wooden benches were destroyed and replaced by stone ones, stretched out to the length of the field and comfortable cabins were installed. In addition to the improvements a complete medical station and excellent sanitary facilities for dames and gentlemen were also available.

On 25 May 1955, the grass pitch was opened in a league match against Sporting (1-1-draw). Évora became the 5th city in the country to have a grass field after Lisbon (National Stadium, Estádio José Alvalade, Estádio da Luz, Campo das Salésias), Porto (Estádio das Antas and Estádio do Lima), Coimbra and Braga. Lusitano was also the fifth club to have a grass pitch, given that the National Stadium and the 28 de Maio Stadium were State-owned.

On 4 April 1956, the Campo Estrela saw its first international matches by welcoming the 2nd. day of the NATO International Tournament receiving the matches between Italy and Turkey and between Portugal and Egypt. The other two days were disputed in Lisbon and in Porto. The following year two English lady's teams came to Portugal to present the practice of football among ladies which was taking its first steps abroad. Again Lisbon, Porto and Évora were the chosen cities.

In 1964 a mysterious virus destroyed the grass entirely.

Silveirinha Sports Complex

Lusitano was supposed to start playing their home matches at the Complexo Desportivo do Lusitano, commonly known as Silveirinha, which was built in 2006 and is able to hold a seating capacity of 10,000. Construction started 7 February 2006 and was accelerated due to Luiz Felipe Scolari`s intention to prepare Portugal for the upcoming 2006 FIFA World Cup in the city of Évora. The existing grounds were old and not suitable for training and holding a friendly match against Cape Verde, so there was a project to abandon the Campo Estrela which would be demolished and Lusitano would start using the Silveirinha complex after the departure of the Portugal national football team.

On the 27 May 2006, Complexo Desportivo do Lusitano hosted an international friendly match between Portugal and Cape Verde in preparation for Portugal participating in the 2006 FIFA World Cup in which Portugal won 4–1. This was the only time an international football match was played in Évora. The Complex had two movable stands installed for that specific match.

However, serious financial difficulties by the club led to an insolvency proceeding which resulted in the abandonment of the Silveirinha facility. Judicial proceedings between the parties that were supposed to urbanize the plots where the Campo Estrela is are still ongoing in court.

In the aftermath of the conflicts between the SAD and the club, the former decided to re-invest in the Silveirinha Complex as the club prohibited the SAD from using the Campo Estrela facilities. Works were not completed in time and so the SAD played the 2019/2020 Campeonato de Portugal season at the Parque Desportivo Eng. Joaquim António Moreira Carneiro, home to Sport Lisboa e Évora.

Rivalries

Rivalry with Juventude de Évora

Lusitano's main rival is Juventude Sport Clube. The clubs are neighbours and the stadiums are confining properties. Literally a few inches from each other. Juventude was founded in 1918, seven years after Lusitano. The clubs met many times in different divisions.

The first clash recorded between Lusitano and Juventude was the Brito Paes-Sarmento Beires Cup on 1 May 1924. António Jacinto da Silva Brito Paes was an adventurer pilot who tried a direct flight to Madeira in 1922 on a plane called the Dark Knight. Guided by a mere compass, the plane crashed on the way, being rescued by a British ship. The intrepid pilot was now planning a journey to Macao in the Pátria, a Breguet 16 Bn2.  The trophy was offered by a committee of merchants of Évora to fund this expedition and to be played, in the Ateneu field, between the Champions of the Évora FA, Lusitano Futebol Club and the well aligned eleven of Juventude Sport. Tickets could be purchased for the price of 2.50 PTE (seated) and 1.50 PTE . Juventude Sport Club won 2–1, thus winning the Brito Paes-Sarmento Beires Cup.

In the 1951/52 season Juventude was promoted to the Segunda Divisão as 1951 national champions of the Third Division. Both clubs fought head to head for the promotion to the Primeira Divisao and at the final matchday the Évora rivals were leveled in points. Lusitano, however, had more goals scored and defeated Juventude at the Campo Estrela and obtained an electrifying 5–5 draw in the Sanches Miranda. Lusitano went through to win promotion to the top tier were it would remain for 14 consecutive seasons thus ending official derbies for a long period as Juventude never achieved promotion to the Primeira Divisão.

Lusitanists usually call rival supporters Cacaruças or Rasga-Roupa, while the Juventudists call Lusitano supporters Erbanários (Herbalists) due to the green and white colours.

In October 2019, as result of the conflict between the SAD and the club, and accusing Juventude of favouring the SAD, Lusitano broke off institutional relations with Juventude and also with SL Évora.

In the 2020/2021 the clubs will once again play in the same league as Juventude earned promotion to Campeonato de Portugal following the cancellation of the Évora FA championship due to the Coronavirus Pandemic.

The Évora Derby 

On 5 December 2020, for the first time, a major Évora Derby was broadcastby a national TV Channel, Channel 11. The match ended with a victory of Lusitano by 0–1, with a late goal from André Galamba.

Current squad
.

Personnel

President of the club
Chairman: Pedro Caldeira

Coaching staff

Head coach: João Nívea
Assistant coach: André Coelho
Goalkeeper coach: Rui Pedro

Coaching history

 Domingos Coelho Morais (1911-1919)
 Manuel Albergaria Seixas Bandarra (1920)
 Anselmo Pisa (1950/52)
 Domingo García y García (1953/54)
 Cândido Tavares (1954/55)
 Severiano Correia (1955/56)
  Otto Bumbel (1956-1958; 1962)
 Lorenzo Ausina (1958-1960)
 Dante Bianchi (1960)
 Trindade dos Santos (1961)
 João Brochado (1961)
 Iosif Fabian (1962/62)
 Janos Biri (1962; 1966)
 János Hrötkö (1963–64)
 Humberto Buchelli (1964)
 Filpo Núñez (1964)
 Miguel Bertral (1964–66)
 Otto Bumbel (1956-1958; 1962)
 Miguel Bertral (1966–69)
 Alberto Cunha (1969–70)
 Leonildo Vilanova (1971-1973; 1989/90)
 Mitó (1973–75)
 Mário Nunes (1977–78)
 Juanito (1979–81)
 Dinis Vital (1982–83)
 Joaquim Teixeira (1983–84)
 Carlos Alhinho (1984–85)
 Mitó (1985–86)
 João Libório (1986–87)
 Carlos Cardoso (1987–88)
 Pedro Gomes (1988–89)
 Joaquim Meirim (1989–90)
 Dinis Vital (1991–92)
 Juanito (1992–93)
 João Cardoso (1993–96)
 José Rocha (1999-2000)
 Luís Perdigão (2000–01)
 Dinis Vital (2001–02)
 Vitor Emoriz (2002-003)
 João Inverno (2003)
 Pedro Baptista (2003–05)
 Teixeira (2005-2006)
 Prof. José Vasques (2006-2007)
 Paulo Sousa (2007-2009)
 João Paulo Fialho (2009-2010)
 Luís Patrão (2010-2011)
 Nélson Valente (2012-2015)
 André Barreto (2016-2017)
 Duarte Machado (2017-2018)
 Rui Salgado (2018-2019)
 Nélson Valente (2019-2022)
 João Nívea (2022-Incumbent)

Notable players

 Cândido Tavares
 Dinis Vital
 José Pedro Biléu
 Falé
 Madeira
 Patalino
 Vicente Di Paola
 Valle
 Pepe
 Soeiro
 Augusto Batalha
 Polido
 Duarte
 Teotónio
 Vicente
 Athos
 Manuel Paixão
 Caraça
 Flora
 Índio
 Teixeira da Silva
 Miguel Bertral
 José Cardona
 Justo Wilfredo Garcia
 Melanio Olmedo
 Morato
 Augusto Matine
 Carlos Zambujo
 Chico Bolota
 Carlos Cunha
 José Chico
 José Cândido
 Dedeu
 Martelo
 Ruzhin Kerimov
 Manuel Sardinha
 Joaquim Ramalho
 Alexandre Alhinho
 Óscar Duarte
 Figueiredo
 Pio
 Zorrinho
 Jorge Vital
 Macaé
 Jorge Teigão
 Rui Romicha
 Zé Eduardo
 Robson
 Paulo Sousa
 José Carlos Barbosa
 Ricardo Pateiro
 Calila
 Toni Lopes
 Zé Tó
 Tó Zé
 Teixeira
 João de Deus
 Nuno Curto
 Toni
 Luís Canhoto
 Hélder Cabral
 Targino

Honours

Military Order of Our Knights of Lord Jesus Christ
  1932

Portuguese Second Division
 Winners (1): 1951–52

Fair-Play Cup Mundo Desportivo
 Winners (2): 1957 and 1958

Portuguese Third Division
 Vice-Champions: 1993–94

Évora FA Championship
 Winners (15): 1917–18, 1921–22, 1922–23, 1926–27, 1927–28, 1928–29, 1930–31, 1932–33, 1933–34, 1934–35, 1939–40, 1940–41, 2003–04, 2021-2022 2018–19

Évora FA Cup

Winners (5): 2003–04, 2015–16, 2016–17, 2017–18, 2020-2021, 2021-2022

Évora FA Supercup
 Winners (3): 2016–17, 2018–19, 2021/2022

League and cup history

Other Sports 
The club had gymnastics, fencing, basketball, rugby, orienteering and tennis sections. The club currently has more than 350 athletes registered.

References

External links
 Official Site
 Profile at ForaDeJogo
 Profile at ZeroZero
  

Football clubs in Portugal
Association football clubs established in 1911
1911 establishments in Portugal
Primeira Liga clubs
Évora